Darin Sceviour (born November 30, 1965) is a Canadian former professional ice hockey right winger. He played in one National Hockey League game for the Chicago Blackhawks during the 1986–87 NHL season. Sceviour was born in Lacombe, Alberta.

See also
List of players who played only one game in the NHL

External links
 

1965 births
Canadian ice hockey right wingers
Chicago Blackhawks draft picks
Chicago Blackhawks players
Ice hockey people from Alberta
Lethbridge Broncos players
Living people
Nova Scotia Oilers players
People from Lacombe, Alberta
Saginaw Generals players